Market Harborough railway station is a Grade II listed station which serves the town of Market Harborough in Leicestershire, England. It is situated to the east of the town centre and lies on the Midland Main Line, 16 miles (26 km) south-east of Leicester.

History
The original station was opened on 1 May 1850 by the London and North Western Railway (LNWR) on the Rugby to Stamford branch of its main line from London Euston to Birmingham and the north-west. The Midland Railway shared this station from 1857 when it built its extension from Leicester to Bedford and Hitchin. On 16 February 1859 the LNWR opened a further branch line, from Northampton to Market Harborough, which also used the same station.

The station was the scene of a serious accident on 28 August 1862.  An excursion train bound for Burton-upon-Trent stopped to pick up water, and a second train bound for Leicester collided with the rear of it. The accident resulted in the death of one person and seventy were injured.

As traffic built up, the Midland opened a new line on 26 June 1885 at a higher elevation, crossing the LNWR and then running parallel to a new joint station in the present position.

The new station building was opened on 14 September 1884. It was built by Parnell and Sons of Rugby from designs by John Livock and Millbank. The engineer was Hirst of Rugby.

Market Harborough was the largest station within the county boundary south of Leicester. Such was the volume of traffic, a junction for five different directions at its height, by 1870 plans for an engine shed were released in addition to the already provided loco pit, turntable and water tank. A shed was never built but this did not stop it becoming a sub-shed of Leicester in later years.

The service on the original LNWR line was drastically reduced in 1960 and it finally closed in June 1966.  Freight traffic on the line to Northampton continued until closure in August 1981, when the station ceased to be a junction. The Midland line continues, with the platform buildings and canopies replaced with modern designs in the sixties. The main building survived, however, and was carefully restored in 1981.

Stationmasters
The station was operated jointly from 14 September 1884 although two station masters remained until 1908 when the London and North Western Railway did away with their post.

LNWR stationmasters

James Heming Edmonds 1850 - 1853 (afterwards station master at Weedon)
Edward Vardy 1853 - 1855
T.B. Dixon 1855 - 1856 (afterwards station master at Wellingborough)
Cornelius Flower 1856 - 1859 (afterwards station master at Blisworth)
George Henry Rich 1859 - 1863
F. Stanbury 1863 - 1865
J.H. Bliss 1865 - 1868 (afterwards station master at Bletchley)
George Norris 1868 - 1874 (afterwards station master at Northampton)
Frederick Sharpe 1874 -  1898 (afterwards station master at Castle Ashby)
William Henry Judge 1898 - 1906 (formerly station master at Wellingborough)
William Smith 1906 - 1908

Midland station masters

Samuel Whitehouse 1857 - 1860
James Maxey ca. 1861 - 1866 (formerly station master at Bourne, afterwards station master at Derby)
H. Warlow 1866
Richard Tomlinson 1866 - 1898 
John Morton Jacques from 1898 - 1901 (afterwards station master at Burton)
Thomas Johnson 1901 - 1925
Horace Edward Neale 1925 - 1931
William Frederick Gee 1931 - 1942 (formerly station master at Flint)
H.F. Vercoe 1942 - 1944 (afterwards station master at Stafford)
N. Brassington 1944 - 1948 (formerly station master at Sandbach)
P.F. Markham 1948 - 1951
T.W. Edgar until 1959
Joseph James O’Brien 1963 - 1965

Services

Market Harborough is served by the fast and semi-fast East Midlands Railway Class 222 "Meridian" services. Trains to London are around every half hour and all off peak trains now start or end at Nottingham. All off peak trains towards London call initially at  before running non stop to London St Pancras International. In the morning and evening some services are extended to Lincoln via Newark.

With a journey time to London of just over one hour, the frequency of trains to the capital in the morning and evening peak is excellent for commuting, with a train running (occasionally non stop) every twenty minutes with the quickest journeys taking fifty-five minutes.

Weekend services include trains operating to York and, in the summer, Scarborough.

Bus services depart from outside the station and operate throughout the town and also to both Lutterworth, Hinckley and Leicester.

The initial specification for the East Midlands Trains franchise, which started in 2007, would have seen a big reduction in the number of trains calling at Market Harborough.  These plans were fought against by the Harborough Rail Users' Group, and, as a result, the final specification saw no reduction in services.

Stagecoach promised as part of their bid that they would create additional car parking spaces at stations along their route, Market Harborough's new larger car park opened early in 2008.

Market Harborough is a Penalty fare station, meaning that as there are facilities to buy tickets at the station, a valid ticket or Permit to travel must be shown when requested, rather than being able to buy tickets on the train.

Future

Market Harborough Line Speed Improvement project

The track layout is set to change significantly as Network Rail engineers set about straightening the line as part of their overall plan to increase line speeds. It is also planned that both platforms will be extended. This work was originally scheduled to be complete by no later than 2012 but was completed by the end of 2019.

The Market Harborough Line Speed Improvement project will deliver:

 A straighter line, enabling a line speed increase through Market Harborough and a reduction in journey time for passengers travelling between London and Sheffield
 A new 265m platform 1 and extended platform 2 to accommodate longer trains with more seats
 A new footbridge with lifts
 A new 300 space car park on the east side of the station (completed in 2018).  Work to increase this in size to 500 spaces started in the summer of 2019 once the new track has been installed and tied in to the existing lines, freeing up the required space.

Electrification

The railway through Leicestershire is not electrified and therefore all services are operated by diesel trains. Plans to electrify this part of the line (as part of the wider Electric Spine project), announced in 2012 and later resumed after a pause in 2015, were cancelled in 2017. However, in February 2019 Andrew Jones, Parliamentary Under Secretary of State for Transport, announced that electrification would be extended northwards from Kettering up to Market Harborough, enabling the connection of the railway to a new power supply point at Braybrooke. On 21 December 2021 the DfT officially announced that work would start on 24 December 2021 on electrification of the section of line between Kettering and Market Harborough.

The next phase of major work will see a 12-mile section electrified between Market Harborough and Wigston in Leicestershire. A programme of piling will run until August 2023 to ready the line for electric wires to be installed throughout 2023.

References

External links

Railway stations in Leicestershire
Former London and North Western Railway stations
Former Midland Railway stations
Railway stations in Great Britain opened in 1850
Railway stations served by East Midlands Railway
Market Harborough
John William Livock buildings
Grade II listed buildings in Leicestershire
Grade II listed railway stations